Golf was contested at the 2015 Summer Universiade from 8–11 July at the  Naju Gold Lake Country Club in Naju, South Korea.

Medal summary

Medal table

References

External links
2015 Summer Universiade – Golf

Golf at the Summer Universiade
2015 Summer Universiade events
Summer Universiade